The 2018–19 Boise State Broncos women's basketball team represents Boise State University during the 2018–19 NCAA Division I women's basketball season. The Broncos, led by 14th-year head coach Gordy Presnell, play their home games at Taco Bell Arena as a member of the Mountain West Conference. They finished the season 28–5, 14–4 in Mountain West play to win the Mountain West regular season title. Boise State won the 2019 Air Force Reserve Mountain West Women’s Basketball Championship, which earned them the automatic bid to the NCAA tournament. They lost in the first round to Oregon State in overtime. With 28 wins, they finish with the most wins in the regular season in school history.

Roster

Schedule

|-
!colspan=9 style=| Exhibition

|-
!colspan=9 style=| Non-conference regular season

|-
!colspan=9 style=| Mountain West regular season

|-
!colspan=9 style=| Mountain West Women's Tournament

|-
!colspan=9 style=| NCAA Women's Tournament

Rankings
2018–19 NCAA Division I women's basketball rankings

See also
2018–19 Boise State Broncos men's basketball team

References

Boise State Broncos women's basketball seasons
Boise State
Boise
Boise
Boise State